Pariyan (also Romanized as Parīyān; also known as Fārīdār, Parīdar, Parīdar-e Parī, Paridar Pari, and Parīdar Parī) is a village in Kamazan-e Vosta Rural District, Zand District, Malayer County, Hamadan Province, Iran. At the 2006 census, its population was 148, in 37 families.

References 

Populated places in Malayer County